Tomorrow Forever is the twelfth album by alternative rock musician Matthew Sweet, funded wholly by his fans through the crowdfunding platform Kickstarter. It was released on June 16, 2017 as a digital download, CD, and as a 2-LP vinyl set.

Production 
The album was funded by a Kickstarter campaign, which ran from June 27 – July 27, 2014. The album's expected April 2015 release date was delayed to June 2017. Sweet originally recorded 38 songs, and cut this down to 17 for the final album, which was the reason for the delay in release. Twelve of the remaining 21 tracks were released in a bonus demo album (Tomorrow's Daughter), sent exclusively to backers of the campaign on Kickstarter, and intended for official release at a later date.

Release 
The album charted at number 27 on the Billboard Independent Albums chart. Critics generally praised the album, but highlighted its familiarity to his earlier albums. The review aggregating website Metacritic reports a normalized score of 77% based on 4 critic reviews.

Track listing

Personnel 
 Rod Argent - piano
 Evan Carter - painting photography
 Paul Chastain - 12 string electric guitar, electric guitar, rhythm guitar 
 Gary Louris - electric guitar, backing vocals
 Sean Magee - mastering
 Valentine McCalumn - baritone, Dobro, electric slide guitar, guitar, electric guitar, steel guitar, mandolin, slide guitar, wah wah guitar
 Ric Menck - drums
 Dan Miggler - art direction
 John Moremen - electric guitar, rhythm guitar
 Debbi Peterson - drums
 Matthew Sweet - bass, engineer, acoustic guitar, electric guitar, mandolin, Mellotron, mixing, organ, piano, primary artist, producer

Chart performance

References

External links 
 

Matthew Sweet albums
2017 albums
Albums produced by Matthew Sweet